Clifton Mill railway station was a railway station serving  Clifton-upon-Dunsmore in the English county of Warwickshire. It was opened on the Rugby and Stamford Railway in 1864.

History
In the same year the company became part of the London and North Western Railway. The section from Rugby to Market Harborough was opened on 1 May 1850. Clifton Mill did not open until 1864. and  although it was single track, it was doubled in 1878.

At grouping in 1923 it became part of the London Midland and Scottish Railway. The station closed on 6 April 1953 and the line closed in 1966.

Site today
Station Road leads from the village centre terminating in a small Mill Lane. Some distance along the former are a number of buildings, where traces of the old track bed may still be made out.

References

External links
 Clifton Mill station on navigable 1954 O. S. map

Former London and North Western Railway stations
Railway stations in Great Britain opened in 1864
Railway stations in Great Britain closed in 1953
Disused railway stations in Warwickshire